The Solidarity Federation, also known by the abbreviation SolFed, is a federation of class struggle anarchists active in Britain. The organisation advocates a strategy of anarcho-syndicalism as a method of abolishing capitalism and the state, and describes itself as a "revolutionary union".  In 1994 it adopted its current name, having previously been the Direct Action Movement since 1979, and before that the Syndicalist Workers' Federation since 1950.

Along with the Anarchist Federation it is one of the two anarchist federations active in the UK.

History

Syndicalist Workers' Federation
The Syndicalist Workers' Federation was a syndicalist group in active in post-war Britain, and one of the Solidarity Federation's earliest predecessors. It was formed in 1950 by members of the dissolved Anarchist Federation of Britain (AFB). Unlike the AFB, which was influenced by anarcho-syndicalist ideas but ultimately not syndicalist itself, the SWF decided to pursue a more definitely syndicalist, worker-centred strategy from the outset.

The group joined the International Workers' Association and during the Franco era gave particular support to the Spanish resistance and the underground CNT anarcho-syndicalist union, previously involved in the 1936 Spanish Revolution and subsequent Civil War against a right-wing military coup backed by both Nazi Germany and Fascist Italy. The SWF initially had some success, but when Tom Brown, a long-term and very active member was forced out of activity, it declined until by 1979 it had one lone branch in Manchester. The SWF then dissolved itself into the group founded as the Direct Action Movement.

Its archives are held by the International Institute of Social History, and a selection of the SWFs publication have been digitally published on libcom.org.

Direct Action Movement

The Direct Action Movement was formed in 1979, when the one remaining SWF branch, along with other smaller anarchist groups, decided to form a new organisation of anarcho-syndicalists in Britain.

The DAM was highly involved in the Miners' Strike as well as a series of industrial disputes later in the 1980s, including the Ardbride dispute in Ardrossan, Scotland, involving a supplier to Laura Ashley, for which the DAM received international support. From 1988 in Scotland, then England and Wales, the DAM was active in opposing the Poll Tax.

In the early 1990s, DAM members set up the Despatch Industry Workers Union, which successfully organised workers for a number of inner-city courier firms.

The DAM was also involved in Anti-Fascist Action (AFA), and was committed to physically combatting British fascist and far-right groups. It often had encounters with groups such as the National Front and the British National Party. Anti-fascist activities in places such as Liverpool, Yorkshire, Bristol and Norwich were heavily influenced by local anarchists. Similarly anarchists, in particular the DAM, were the first to question the motives and tactics of the anti-fascist Searchlight magazine.

In March 1994, DAM changed its name to the Solidarity Federation.

Structure

Federalism

The Solidarity Federation organises according to the principles of anarchist federalism. The base unit of the federation is the Local, groups of members based within a specific geographical area. These local groups are autonomous, within the bounds laid out in the Solidarity Federation's constitution. These local groups come together as a confederation to form the national organisation. This most importantly manifests at the national conference, where each local presents a delegate to represent them. These local delegates do not act independently, but instead are guided by the mandate (formal instructions) their fellow members have given them. In this way, the Solidarity Federation is an attempt at a working grassroots democracy. This confederated national conference is the highest decision making body in the Solidarity Federation.

Internationally, the Solidarity Federation forms the British section of International Workers' Association, an international federation of anarcho-syndicalist unions and groups. With the IWA also following the principles of federalism, the Solidarity Federation plays a role in the IWA similar to that of a local in SolFed, as a group of members organised by geographical region. All SolFed members are automatically members of the IWA.

Workplace organising

Industrial Networks
Solidarity Federation members who work in the same employment sector have formed Industrial Networks. Their purpose is to promote solidarity amongst workers and focus on developing and implementing a direct action strategy to fight for better pay and conditions in their industry.

Organiser Training (open course)
Solidarity Federation are responsible for supplying volunteer staff to run a workplace organiser training course intended to "give people the tools and confidence to organise in their workplaces and win grievances". This training is open to non-members and focuses on how building a 'shop committee' can form a platform by which to initiate an effective anarcho-syndicalist approach to workplace issues.

In addition, training on supporting direct action casework is provided by members involved in the hospitality workers and housing campaigns.

Activities

End Unpaid Work

In early 2012, Solidarity Federation initiated a national campaign against workfare. The organisation describe workfare as a government initiative to implement 'schemes in which people are forced to work without wages in order to receive their benefits'. Solidarity Federation further claim that workfare is 'part of a long term re-structuring of the labour market towards more temporary, lower paid jobs and with poorer conditions and fewer benefits'  by 'placing significant downward pressure on the wages and conditions of those of us who work.'

The campaign initially focused specifically on Holland and Barrett, a health supplement corporation making use of placements staffed by unpaid benefits claimants. On 5 July 2012, after a sustained series of pickets at Holland and Barrett stores across the UK, the company announced via social media and its website that it was pulling out of the workfare scheme, citing negative publicity. This announcement came just days before a national 'week of action against workfare', organised jointly with Boycott Workfare, was due to begin. A Solidarity Federation spokesperson speaking to The Guardian newspaper described the victory as:...not just a victory for claimants, [but] a victory for all of us as workfare undermines pay and conditions Later targets for pickets included Poundland, with pickets taking place in several cities.

Sussex University Pop Up Union 
Members of the Brighton Solidarity Federation local were heavily involved in the organisation of a pop up union at the University of Sussex in 2013. The pop up union was set up in response to plans to outsource 235 workers to private firms, which led to a large protest campaign on the Sussex campus including demonstrations and the occupation of the university conference centre.

The pop up union was formed for the purpose of enabling staff to take part in legally recognised strike action, something the existing unions on campus had been unwilling to do despite strong support in indicative ballots. The pop up union required workers to pay a small notional membership fee to join, and quickly grew to be the second largest union on the university campus. It held a ballot on taking strike action in May 2013 which led to a vote to strike. However, this was annulled following legal challenge by the university.

An assessment of the pop up union by SolFed members involved in its organisation, The Pop Up Union: a postmortem, was published on the Solidarity Federation website.

Hospitality Workers Campaign 

In October 2013 the Brighton local launched a campaign to organise hospitality workers in the city. Spearheaded by Solidarity Federation members working in the sector, the campaign focuses on building solidarity amongst workers across the sector and taking action regarding issues including below minimum wage pay, long shifts without breaks, the lack of written or verbal contracts, unpaid overtime, unlawful deductions from wages and no holiday entitlement. Weekly drop in sessions are held for workers in the sector to bring issues and to discuss potential campaigns of action.

A campaign will usually begin with a demand letter being presented to the employer, stating the grievance, what is demanded and the timescale within which these demands should be met otherwise the campaign will be escalated. Tactics for escalation include boycotts, publicity, phone and email blockades and pickets of the workplace. As much as possible the campaign seeks to involve the worker and their colleagues in the campaign and to involve workers from other disputes.

The Brighton Solidarity Federation website mentions 21 previous disputes, with £38,830.50 in owed wages and holiday entitlement listed as having been paid.

A similar campaign was launched by hospitality workers in the Liverpool local in August 2017.

Brighton Housing Campaign 
Since 2015, the Brighton local has been publicly campaigning on issues around rented housing. Similar to the hospitality workers campaign the local holds weekly drop ins to help tenants to organise around issues including agency fees, withheld deposits and poor housing conditions. It has been involved in a number of campaigns targeting landlords and estate agents who provide substandard housing or withhold money owed.

One article from November 2017 mentions three successful cases from the proceeding three months. The cases led to £6,510 being paid to tenants as compensation and to repairs being carried out as a result of the campaign.

Bristol Care Workers Network 
In June 2017 Bristol local founded the Bristol Care Workers Network. This is a network of health and social care workers seeking to organise for better rights, pay and terms for workers in the sector. Whilst not formally part of the Solidarity Federation it retains close links to the organisation.

Locals

Brighton
Bristol
Edinburgh
Leeds
Liverpool
Manchester
Newcastle
North London
South London
Southampton
Thames Valley

See also 

Anarchism in England
Anarchism in Scotland

References

Further reading

External links
 Solidarity Federation website
 List of Solidarity Federation local sections
 Liverpool Solidarity Federation website
 Brighton Solidarity Federation website
 Bristol Care Workers Network
 Solidarity Federation archive at libcom.org

Organizations established in 1979
International Workers' Association
Anarchist organisations in the United Kingdom
Syndicalism
1950 establishments in the United Kingdom
Anarchist Federations
Anarchism in England
Anarchism in Scotland
Far-left politics in Scotland